Versare Car Company was a bus and trolley bus maker founded in 1925 and originally based in Watervliet, New York. Among their early work were experimental buses that utilized diesel and electric engines that could be run alone or together, a technique that could be seen as a very early ancestor to dual-mode vehicles of the modern day.

In 1928, the assets of the company were purchased by the Cincinnati Car Company and the company's base was moved from Watervliet to Cincinnati, Ohio. The Versare nameplate returned in 1931 and remained until its demise in 1938.

Products

"Atwater Street Monster", an 8-wheeled bus used in Montreal

References

External links
Cincinnati Car Company at Builders of Wooden Railway Cars (archived)
Versare Car Corp at Builders of Wooden Railway Cars (archived)
Versare Corporation at Coachbuilt.com

Bus manufacturers of the United States
Companies based in Albany County, New York
Vehicle manufacturing companies established in 1925
Vehicle manufacturing companies disestablished in 1938
1925 establishments in New York (state)
1938 disestablishments in Ohio